Adam Schantz (October 9, 1819November 5, 1879) was a German American immigrant, farmer, and Democratic politician.  He served six years in the Wisconsin State Senate and two years in the State Assembly, representing Washington County.

Biography
Schantz was born on October 9, 1819, in Bavaria, Germany. He moved with his family to the United States in 1828, settling in Oneida County, New York. After living for a time in Oswego County, New York, the family moved to Washington County, Wisconsin, in 1846. Schantz later lived in Addison, Wisconsin, and Oak Grove, Dodge County, Wisconsin. In 1848, he married Catharine Schwartz, who was also a native of Bavaria. They had four children. He moved to Schleisingerville, Wisconsin, (now Slinger) in 1874. Schantz died in 1879.

Career
Schantz was elected Justice of the Peace in what is now Hartford, Wisconsin, in 1846 and Register of Deeds of Washington County in 1852. He served two terms in the Assembly before serving in the Senate from 1868 to 1874. Schantz was a Democrat.

References

See also
The Political Graveyard

 

 

 

 

Bavarian emigrants to the United States
People from Oneida County, New York
People from Oswego County, New York
People from Dodge County, Wisconsin
People from Hartford, Wisconsin
Democratic Party Wisconsin state senators
Democratic Party members of the Wisconsin State Assembly
1819 births
1879 deaths
19th-century American politicians
People from Slinger, Wisconsin
People from Addison, Wisconsin